Nitchevo (Russian for "nothing", "ничего" [nʲɪʨɪˈvo]) is a 1936 French drama film directed by Jacques de Baroncelli and starring Harry Baur, Marcelle Chantal and George Rigaud. It is a remake of the 1926 silent film of the same name.

The film's sets were designed by the art directors Serge Piménoff and Georges Wakhévitch

Cast
 Harry Baur as Le commandant Robert Cartier  
 Marcelle Chantal as Thérèse Sabianne  
 George Rigaud as Hervé de Kergoët 
 Jean-Max as Sarak  
 Lisette Lanvin as Claire  
 Ivan Mozzhukhin as L'officier Meuter  
 Paul Azaïs as Lemoule, un matelot  
 Jean Tissier as L'inventeur Ducourjour  
 Habib Benglia as Un matelot  
 Jean Daurand as Un matelot  
 Abel Tarride as Arbères  
 Paul Velsa as Le cuisinier 
 Lucien Coëdel as Le radio  
 Marcel Lupovici as Le lieutenant  
 Philippe Richard as Le gardien chef 
 Philippe Derevel 
 Jean Dunot 
 Rodolphe Marcilly 
 André Siméon

Reception
Writing for Night and Day in 1937, Graham Greene gave the film a mildly poor review, complaining primarily that the film "has a bad story - and a very obscure one". Greene described the film as formulaic in its presentation, however he conceded that "the picture is worth a visit for the final situation in a sunk submarine and for the acting of M. Harry Baur".

References

Bibliography
 Dayna Oscherwitz & MaryEllen Higgins. The A to Z of French Cinema. Scarecrow Press, 2009.

External links 
 

1936 films
French drama films
1936 drama films
1930s French-language films
Films directed by Jacques de Baroncelli
Remakes of French films
Sound film remakes of silent films
Submarine films
French black-and-white films
1930s French films